Juan Carlos Iván Pineda Vázquez (born 22 July 1992) is a Mexican professional footballer who plays as a defender for UAT.

References

External links

Living people
1992 births
Mexican footballers
Association football defenders
C.F. Pachuca players
Club León footballers
Atlas F.C. footballers
FC Juárez footballers
Tlaxcala F.C. players
Correcaminos UAT footballers
Mineros de Zacatecas players
Liga MX players
Ascenso MX players
Liga Premier de México players
Tercera División de México players
Footballers from Tamaulipas
People from Ciudad Victoria